Cosgrove is a suburb of Townsville in the City of Townsville, Queensland, Australia.

Geography 
Cosgrove is bordered by the North Coast railway line to the north with the Bruce Highway running parallel and immediately south of the railway line. The Bohle River forms the western boundary.

History 

The suburb was named after General Sir Peter Cosgrove, the former head of the Australian Defence Force and leader of Queensland Government taskforce for the rebuilding of Innisfail region after cyclone Larry in March 2006.

Facilities 
The Reverend Charles Harris Diversionary Centre is located on Abattoir Road. It is a 50-bed facility to provide a place of safety and monitoring for Indigenous people affected by alcohol as an alternative to being held in the Townsville police watch house.

Education 
There are no schools in Cosgrove. The nearest government primary school is Bohlevale State School in neighbouring Burdell to the north-west. The nearest government secondary school is Northern Beaches State High School in Deeragun to the north-west.

References 

Suburbs of Townsville